Otsego High School is the only high school located in Otsego, Michigan and part of the Otsego School District.

References

Schools in Allegan County, Michigan
Public high schools in Michigan